Johannes Mashiane, nicknamed The Beast of Atteridgeville, was a South African rapist and serial killer who was responsible for the deaths of 13 victims before committing suicide in 1989. Mashiane was being chased by police in the Pretoria suburb of Marabastad when he jumped underneath a bus.

Mashiane started his murderous activity in 1977 by killing his girlfriend. He was sentenced to five years' imprisonment and was released in 1982. After being released, he immediately started his spate of murder and sodomy, accounting for the deaths of at least 12 young boys by strangulation or stoning. One victim is known to have survived Mashiane's attention.

See also
List of serial killers by country
List of serial killers by number of victims

References 

1989 suicides
Male serial killers
Prisoners and detainees of South Africa
Road incident deaths in South Africa
South African murderers of children
South African prisoners and detainees
South African rapists
South African serial killers
Suicides in South Africa
Violence against men in Africa
Year of birth missing